Mike Nealy is an American sports executive. He was the president, CEO, and alternate governor of the Arizona Coyotes of the National Hockey League (NHL) until 2014 when he was named the executive director of the Fiesta Bowl.

References

External links
Mike Nealy's staff profile at Eliteprospects.com

Year of birth missing (living people)
Living people
National Hockey League team presidents
Arizona Coyotes executives